Davis Peak may refer to:

 Davis Peak (Washington) in the North Cascades
 Davis Peak (British Columbia) in the Monashee Mountains
 Jeff Davis Peak, a variant name of Doso Doyabi near Wheeler Peak (Nevada)

See also
 Mount Davis (disambiguation)